Waiporia is a genus of Polynesian araneomorph spiders in the family Orsolobidae, and was first described by Raymond Robert Forster & Norman I. Platnick in 1985.

Species
 it contains twelve species, found only in New Zealand:
Waiporia algida (Forster, 1956) – New Zealand
Waiporia chathamensis Forster & Platnick, 1985 – New Zealand (Chatham Is.)
Waiporia egmont Forster & Platnick, 1985 – New Zealand
Waiporia extensa (Forster, 1956) – New Zealand
Waiporia hawea Forster & Platnick, 1985 – New Zealand
Waiporia hornabrooki (Forster, 1956) – New Zealand
Waiporia mensa (Forster, 1956) – New Zealand
Waiporia modica (Forster, 1956) – New Zealand
Waiporia owaka Forster & Platnick, 1985 – New Zealand
Waiporia ruahine Forster & Platnick, 1985 – New Zealand
Waiporia tuata Forster & Platnick, 1985 – New Zealand
Waiporia wiltoni Forster & Platnick, 1985 (type) – New Zealand

See also
 List of Orsolobidae species

References

Araneomorphae genera
Orsolobidae
Spiders of New Zealand
Taxa named by Raymond Robert Forster
Endemic spiders of New Zealand